Arsalan Fathipour (born 1965) is an Iranian politician.

Fathipour was born in Kaleybar, East Azerbaijan. He is a member of the 7th, 8th and 9th Islamic Consultative Assembly from the electorate of Hurand, Khoda Afarin and Kaleybar. Fathipour won with 29,879 (47.40%) votes.

References

External links
 Fathipour Website

People from East Azerbaijan Province
Deputies of Kaleybar, Khoda Afarin and Hurand
Living people
1965 births
Members of the 9th Islamic Consultative Assembly
Members of the 8th Islamic Consultative Assembly
Members of the 7th Islamic Consultative Assembly
Followers of Wilayat fraction members